Charaxes howarthi is a butterfly in the family Nymphalidae. It is found in Tanzania, northern Angola, northern Zambia and the Democratic Republic of the Congo (Shaba). The habitat consists of Brachystegia woodland and open forests.

The larvae feed on Brachystegia spiciformis and Albizia antunesiana.
 
Notes on the biology of howarthi are provided by Kielland (1990) and Larsen (1991) 

The name honours Graham Howarth.

Taxonomy
The male is very similar to both Charaxes manica and Charaxes chintechi

References

Charaxes howarthi images at Consortium for the Barcode of Life
Charaxes howarthi ssp. images at BOLD
Images of C. howarthi Royal Museum for Central Africa (Albertine Rift Project)

Butterflies described in 1976
howarthi